The 2008 Massachusetts Democratic presidential primary was held on Super Tuesday, February 5, 2008, and had a total of 93 delegates at stake. The winner in each of Massachusetts's 10 congressional districts was awarded all of that district's delegates, totaling 61. Another 32 delegates were awarded to the statewide winner, Hillary Clinton. The 93 delegates represented Massachusetts at the Democratic National Convention in Denver, Colorado. Twenty-six other unpledged delegates, known as superdelegates, also attended the convention and cast their votes as well. Hillary Clinton won despite Obama receiving endorsements from both senators, Ted Kennedy and John Kerry, and the Governor Deval Patrick.

Polls

Polls indicated that Hillary Clinton was leading Barack Obama in the days leading up to the contest in Massachusetts. Clinton won every pre-election poll except one, and of those she won, Clinton won all but one of them by double digits.

Results

Analysis

Hillary Clinton won a convincing victory in Massachusetts over Barack Obama due to a number of factors. According to exit polls, 85 percent of voters in the Massachusetts Democratic Primary were Caucasians and they opted for Clinton by a margin of 58-40 percent compared to the 6 percent of African American voters who backed Obama by a margin of 66-29. Hispanics/Latinos, which comprised 5 percent of the total voters, backed Clinton by a margin of 56-36 percent. Clinton narrowly won the youth vote (those ages 18–29) by a margin of 49-48 and tied the vote among voters ages 30–44; she also won all voters over the age of 45 by a margin of 60.5-38. Pertaining to socioeconomic class, Clinton won all levels of family income except highly affluent voters making $200,000 or more a year, as they backed Obama by a narrow margin of 53-47 percent. As for educational attainment levels, Clinton won all categories except those with postgraduate degrees who backed Obama by a margin of 51-47 percent. Among self-identified Democrats in the primary, which made up 65 percent of the total electorate, they went for Clinton by a 58-41 margin while Independents, which comprised a healthy 33 percent of the electorate, also went for Clinton by a 54-42 margin. She also won all ideological groups. Clinton also won all major religious denominations – Protestants 53-46; Roman Catholics 64-33; other Christians 51-47; and other religions 49-46. Obama won Jews by a margin of 52-48 as well as atheists/agnostics by a margin of 53-45.

Clinton performed extremely well statewide, carrying a majority of counties and sweeping most of the major urban areas and cities. Obama won Boston by fewer than 10,000 votes, while Clinton won other urban and conservative towns such as Springfield and Worcester.

Obama had picked up major endorsements from the Massachusetts Democratic establishment prior to Super Tuesday. Both U.S. Senators Ted Kennedy and John Kerry threw their support behind Obama, along with Governor Deval Patrick. Clinton also picked up a number of top-tier endorsements from Mayor Thomas Menino of Boston and Speaker of the Massachusetts House of Representatives Salvatore DiMasi along with U.S. Representatives Richard Neal and Barney Frank, one of the three openly gay members of the U.S. Congress.

See also
 2008 Democratic Party presidential primaries
 2008 Massachusetts Republican presidential primary

References

Massachusetts
2008
Presidential Democratic
2008 Super Tuesday